Csiki is a Hungarian surname. Notable people with the surname include:

 Anna Csiki (born 1999), Hungarian footballer 
 Ernő Csíki (1875–1954), Hungarian entomologist
 Norbert Csiki (born 1991), Hungarian footballer

Hungarian-language surnames